Cowles House may refer to:

in the United States
(by state)
 Gen. George Cowles House, Farmington, CT, listed on the NRHP in Connecticut
 Capt. Josiah Cowles House, Southington, CT, listed on the NRHP in Connecticut
 Cowles House (Macon, Georgia), listed on the NRHP in Georgia
 Jerry Cowles Cottage, Macon, GA, listed on the NRHP in Georgia
 Cowles, George H and Alice Spaulding, House, Osceola, IA, listed on the NRHP in Iowa
 Cowles House (East Lansing, Michigan), at Michigan State University
 W. T. Cowles House, Glens Falls, NY, listed on the NRHP in New York
 Brown-Cowles House and Cowles Law Office, Wilkesboro, NC, listed on the NRHP in North Carolina